Eduard Julius Ernst August Erdmann, Prince von Anhalt (born 3 December 1941), usually referred to as Prince Eduard, is the head of the House of Ascania, the family which ruled the Duchy of Anhalt until 1918.

Life and family
Eduard was born at Schloss Ballenstedt in Ballenstedt, in what is now the German state of Saxony-Anhalt, the youngest of the five children of the last reigning Duke of Anhalt, Joachim Ernst, and of his second wife Editha "Edda" Charlotte Wilhelmine Marwitz, who allegedly paid 10,000 marks to Bertha von Stephani to improve her social standing by adult adoption.

On 9 October 1963, Eduard's older brother Friedrich died childless in a car crash. He uses the title Prince of Anhalt, but is referred to by others as Duke of Anhalt. The succession of Eduard and his brother was disputed by their uncle Prince Eugen who also claimed the headship of house after the death of Duke Joachim Ernst. The death without male issue in 1980 of Prince Eugen left Prince Eduard as the sole claimant to the headship of the house.

Eduard lived in the United States for several years, working in a number of retail sales positions, before returning to Germany in 1967.  He has been a journalist and columnist for numerous German magazines.  He has also hosted a television programme Adel verpflichet (Noblesse oblige) for RTL Television. Subsequently, Anhalt became a frequent German television commentator for royal events.

In 1978, Eduard wrote a book about his family's traditions, Askanische Sagen Über die Entstehung der Deutschen (English: Ascanian Legends and the Origins of the Germans).  A revised and expanded edition of the book with the title Sagenhaftes Askanien: Geschichten und Legenden (English: Incredible Ascania, Stories and Legends) was published in 2004.

Eduard has served as deputy chairman of the Société des Amis of the Almanach de Gotha reboot.

Due to his father's incarceration in a concentration camp from 1938 to 1944, Eduard's paternity has been questioned. In 1990 his eldest sister Princess Marie Antoinette (called Alexandra) termed him her 'half brother' to the press, and alleged that his father was Heinrich Himmler. Eduard responded by suggesting the matter was simply a dispute between siblings, and that she wished to besmirch his name.

In April 1990, Eduard asserted ownership of the family seat Schloss Ballenstedt, which had been confiscated by the Communist authorities in East Germany after World War II. He was unsuccessful, and there were lengthy administrative disputes, although relations with the town administration of Ballenstedt subsequently improved.

After a further long legal fight with the town administration, which had insisted on first right of refusal, in May 2000 Eduard managed to purchase for 400,000 D-Marks another property of the family which had been requisitioned. This was the small but historic domed neoclassical hunting lodge, Röhrkopf, built in 1770, which lies within the former park of Schloss Ballenstedt. It has now become the family seat, and three holiday apartments for general rental have been constructed within its garden. Fear of lingering animosity towards the family, including over issues of restitution, inhibited his children from resettling in Anhalt, although after her divorce his wife bought a home in Dessau, and worked to promote the region.

A difficulty for Eduard has been the adult adoptees of his aunt Princess Marie-Auguste of Anhalt. Adopted for what has been presumed to be mercenary reasons, and laying claim to be princes of Anhalt, they are estimated to number 35 persons. Outside of Germany the most notable of the adoptees is the last husband of Zsa Zsa Gabor, Frederic von Anhalt formerly, Hans Georg Robert Lichtenberg. In 2010, Eduard released a statement restating that such individuals would never be officially recognised by the family as members of House of Anhalt-Ascania.

Eduard gained international attention in August 2010 when he claimed to have advanced knowledge of the engagement of his distant cousin Prince William of Wales to Kate Middleton. Although a spokesperson for the British Royal family denied Eduard's claim, the engagement was indeed announced a few months later.

Marriage and children 
On 21 July 1980, in Munich, Eduard married Corinne Gisa Elisabeth Krönlein (born Würzburg, 19 August 1961), daughter of Günther Krönlein and wife Anneliese Benz, in a civil ceremony. The couple renewed their vows in a religious ceremony on 7 June 1986 in S-charl, near Scuol, Switzerland, but later divorced in 2014. Eduard and Corinne have three daughters: 
 Julia Katharina Elisabeth (born 14 December 1980, Bad Tölz) married 12 July 2008 Marc Bernath,
 Julius Maxime Laszlo (born 21 December 2010, Munich)
 Julia Eilika Nicole (born 1 January 1985, Munich), has one son and one daughter with her partner, Fabian Harte: 
 Leopold (b. 2011)
 Julia Philine (b. 2013)
 Julia Felicitas Leopoldine Friederike Franziska (born 14 May 1993, Munich)

Succession
Eduard is the last male of what is considered the "House of Ascania", itself from the Billung dynasty, traced back ultimately to the Count Wichmann (Wychmannus comes) in 811 AD. If Eduard died without male issue, the House would be considered extinct. The male line of Ascanians survives, however, in the Counts von Westarp, descendants of Prince Franz of Anhalt-Bernburg-Schaumburg-Hoym and his morganatic wife Karoline Westarp and the Counts von Waldersee who descend from Count Franz Johann von Waldersee (1763–1823), illegitimate son of Leopold III, Duke of Anhalt-Dessau (1740–1817) and his mistress Eleonore Hofmeyer (1739–1816).
In 2010 Eduard modified the House of Anhalt-Ascania Laws, abolishing the Salic or Semi-Salic laws; recognising his first born daughter as his heir; and ruling that gender would in future be irrelevant in determining the line of descent.

Dynastic honours
 House of Ascania: Sovereign Knight Grand Cross with Collar of the Ducal Order of Albert the Bear
 Two Sicilian Royal Family: Bailiff Knight Grand Cross of Justice and Honour with Collar of the Two Sicilian Royal Sacred Military Constantinian Order of Saint George

Ancestry

References

External links
 Official website of the Ducal Family of Anhalt
 Order of Albert the Bear

German royalty
Princes of Anhalt
Dukes of Anhalt
1941 births
Living people
Sons of monarchs